Algimantas Šalna (also transliterated Shalna, born 12 September 1959) is a former Lithuanian, Soviet biathlete.

Šalna won gold medals during the World Championships as a relayist in 1983 and 1985. As a member of the Soviet relay team, he won a gold medal at the 1984 Winter Olympics – he was the first Lithuanian-born athlete to win a medal in the Winter Olympics. As an individual he placed fifth in its 10 km competition. He moved to the U.S. in 1991 and coached the U.S. Olympic biathlon teams of 1994, 1998, 2002, and 2006.

Biathlon results
All results are sourced from the International Biathlon Union.

Olympic Games
1 medal (1 gold)

World Championships
2 medals (2 gold)

*During Olympic seasons competitions are only held for those events not included in the Olympic program.
**Team was added as an event in 1989.

Individual victories
4 victories (1 In, 3 Sp)

*Results are from UIPMB and IBU races which include the Biathlon World Cup, Biathlon World Championships and the Winter Olympic Games.

References

External links
 
 
 
 

1959 births
Living people
People from Ignalina District Municipality
Soviet male biathletes
Lithuanian male biathletes
Biathletes at the 1984 Winter Olympics
Olympic biathletes of the Soviet Union
Medalists at the 1984 Winter Olympics
Olympic medalists in biathlon
Olympic gold medalists for the Soviet Union
Biathlon World Championships medalists